Berberis wilcoxii is a shrub native to Arizona, New Mexico and Sonora. It is up to 2 m tall, with pinnately compound leaves of 5-7 leaflets, densely clustered racemes and ovoid berries up to 10 mm long. It is generally found in rocky canyons in mountainous areas at an elevation of 1700–2500 m.

The compound leaves place this species in the group sometimes segregated as the genus Mahonia.

References

wilcoxii
Flora of Arizona
Flora of New Mexico
Flora of Sonora
Plants described in 1894